The Asian Women's Volleyball Cup, also known as the AVC Cup for Women, is an international volleyball competition in Asia and Oceania contested by the top senior women's national teams of the members of Asian Volleyball Confederation (AVC), the sport's continent governing body. The tournaments have been awarded every two years since 2008. The current champion is Japan, which won its first title at the 2022 tournament.

The 7 Asian Cup tournaments have been won by three different national teams. China have won five times. The other Asian Cup winners are Japan and Thailand, with one title each.

The 2022 Asian Cup took place in Pasig, Philippines.

In August 2022, beginning next year the biennial tournament will now be done annually and will be the qualifying tournament for the FIVB Challenger Cup according to AVC Control Committee President and Technical Director Dr. Han Joo Eom.

This event should not be confused with the other, more prestigious, continental competition for Asian national volleyball teams, the Asian Volleyball Championship and Asian Volleyball Challenge Cup.

Results summary

Teams reaching the top four

Champions by region

Hosts
List of hosts by number of cups hosted.

Medal summary

Participating nations
Legend
 – Champions
 – Runners-up
 – Third place
 – Fourth place
 – Did not enter / Did not qualify
 – Hosts
Q – Qualified for forthcoming tournament

Debut of teams

Awards

Former awards

See also
 Asian Men's Volleyball Cup
 Asian Women's Volleyball Challenge Cup
 Asian Women's Volleyball Championship
 Volleyball at the Asian Games
 Asian Women's U23 Volleyball Championship
 Asian Women's U20 Volleyball Championship
 Asian Girls' U18 Volleyball Championship

References

External links
 Asian Volleyball Confederation – official website
 AVC Competition Results

 
V
International volleyball competitions
International women's volleyball competitions
Volleyball competitions in Asia
Biennial sporting events
2008 establishments in Asia
Asian Volleyball Confederation competitions